Vriesea plurifolia is a plant species in the genus Vriesea. This species is endemic to Brazil.

References

plurifolia
Flora of Brazil